The gold reserve of the United Kingdom is the amount of gold kept by Bank of England as a store of value of part of the United Kingdom's wealth. Leftover from the Gold Standard which the country abandoned in 1931, it is the 17th largest central bank reserve in the world with 310.29 tonnes of gold bars.

History

World War II
Prior to Britain's declaration of war in September 1939 vast amounts of gold were being shipped across the Atlantic to the United States via Montreal, Quebec, Canada to pay for weapons. After France was invaded by Nazi Germany, fear of Britain also suffering the same fate led to most of the country's gold being relocated under a secret operation known as Operation Fish. In May 1940, under the order of the UK Government; 280 tonnes of the nation's gold was transported from the Bank of England in London up to Martins' Bank in Liverpool ready to be shipped to Canada.

By the end of the war in 1945, Britain was estimated to have reserves in excess of 1772.94 tonnes, however, with incomplete records; the figure may have been higher.

Brown's Bottom
 In May 1999, then-Chancellor of the Exchequer Gordon Brown announced plans to sell off 415 tonnes of gold in order to diversify the country's reserves owing to the volatile value of gold. The first series of sales amounting to 125 tonnes took place in the year 2000 across five auctions with each selling 25 tonnes. By the end of 2002, UK gold reserves dropped to 355.25 tonnes while at the same time the value of gold increased dramatically leading to an estimated loss of £2,000,000,000 from the gold sold.

Gold reserves

See also
 Whole of Government Accounts
 Exchange Equalisation Account

References

Gold standard
HM Treasury